Abuzarabad (also Romanized as Abūz̄arābād) is a village in Miyan Deh Rural District, Shibkaveh District, Fasa County, Fars Province, Iran. At the 2006 census, its population was 562, in 120 families.

References 

Populated places in Fasa County